Zanzibar is an Italian television sitcom which aired from 12 September to 5 November 1988.
It was broadcast on the private TV channel Italia Uno.  The cast included Claudio Bisio, David Riondino, Cesare Bocci, and Antonio Catania.

Notes and references

See also
List of Italian television series

External links
 

Italian television series
Italia 1 original programming